Morannes sur Sarthe-Daumeray is a commune in the department of Maine-et-Loire, western France. The municipality was established on 1 January 2017 by merger of the former communes of Morannes-sur-Sarthe and Daumeray. Morannes-sur-Sarthe was the result of the merger on 1 January 2016 of the communes of Morannes and Chemiré-sur-Sarthe.

See also 
Communes of the Maine-et-Loire department

References 

Communes of Maine-et-Loire